The Royal Grammar School (originally The Free School) is a selective English independent day school for boys in Guildford, Surrey. Its foundation dates to the death in 1509 of Robert Beckingham who left a provision in his will to "make a free scole at the Towne of Guldford"; in 1512 a governing body was set up to form the school. The school moved to the present site in the upper High Street after the granting of a royal charter from King Edward VI on 27 January 1553. The school became independent and fee paying on 1 September 1977, when the parents and staff raised sufficient funds to purchase it following concerns about the abolition of grammar schools and the introduction of comprehensive education. Initially the school educated 30 of the "poorest men's sons", however numbers have since grown to approximately 900 students, 300 of whom are in the sixth form.

Former pupils of the school are referred to as "Old Guildfordians" and are often referred to as "OGs" in official school correspondence. Since the school's founding, notable alumni have included the 75th Archbishop of Canterbury, Olympic athletes, the longest serving speaker of the House of Commons of the United Kingdom, several members of the parliament of the United Kingdom, a founding member of the East India Company and the 11th Premier of New Zealand.

Old Guildfordians

"—" indicates year of leaving is unknown.

References

Guildfordian
 
Royal Grammar School, Guildford
Surrey-related lists